Sabeco (also SABECO, Saigon Alcohol Beer and Beverage Joint Stock Corporation) is Vietnam's leading beer producer. It was under the authority of Vietnam's Ministry of Trade and Industry but is now a subsidiary of ThaiBev. In 2011, Sabeco produced 1.2 billion liters of beer, 51.4% of the national market. Its main brands are Bia Saigon (Saigon Beer) and 333 Beer.

Sabeco has several regional subsidiaries throughout Vietnam.

Ownership
Vietnam's Ministry of Trade and Industry owned almost 89.59% of Sabeco as of September 2012, as well a majority of shares of the competitor Habeco. The Ministry's leadership announced in July 2012 that it did not yet intend to cease controlling the company.
Nguyễn Bá Thi, former chairman of the Managing Board who was fired by the Ministry in May 2012, said that the Ministry had been interfering too much in the company.

Sabeco had an initial public offering in 2008.

As of September 2012 there were five international companies that were interested in investing in Sabeco.
Heineken, SAB Miller, Kirin and Asahi have indicated interest in becoming a stakeholder or strategic partner.

Bangkok-based ThaiBev bought a majority of shares in Sabeco in 2018 for 4.8 billion US dollars, ending Sabeco's domestic ownership. At the time of the acquisition, Sabeco's Vietnam market share had fallen below 40 percent.

Market share and competition

Sabeco's market share was 51.4% in 2010. Its main competitors are Habeco (also owned by the Ministry of Industry and Trade) (13.9%) and Vietnam Brewery Limited (VBL, 29.7%), a joint-venture of Singapore's Asia Pacific Breweries and Saigon Trading Group (Satra), which brews and sells Heineken, Tiger Beer and Bière Larue in Vietnam.

Vietnam War Era
Ba Muoi Ba Biere (33 Beer) was a popular local brand among American soldiers during the U.S. war in Vietnam. It was the precursor to "333" Biere. "33" Biere Export is made by BGI Tien Giang.

Gallery

References

External link

Beer in Vietnam
Manufacturing companies based in Ho Chi Minh City
Drink companies of Vietnam